The Ducal Palace in Sassuolo is a Baroque villa located in the town of Sassuolo, thirty minutes outside Modena, northern Italy.

History
The palace was built on the site of a medieval castle or rocca. Obtained by Niccolò III d'Este from the della Rosa family in the 15th century, and converted into a court residence by Borso d'Este in 1458.

The exterior facade seems to reference Tuscan villas more than those of the Veneto. In the mid-16th century, the first pleasure summer villa was built on the site. In the early 17th century, the Duke Francesco I d'Este commissioned the present building from the architect Bartolomeo Avanzini. Over the centuries, the palace has had many owners, but is now owned by the town of Sassuolo and the Gallerie Estensi, who contributed to the picture galleries the Orlando, Princess and Secchia apartments.

The exhibition 
The palace is best known for its highly decorated interior frescoes (1638-1656) by the French Este court painter Jean Boulanger, as well as several perspectival ceilings by Ottavio Vivani, Giacomo Cialdieri, Angelo Michele Colonna, Agostino Mitelli, Baldassare Bianchi and Giovanni Giacomo Monti. Lattanzio Maschio and Luca Colombi were also invited by Boulanger to work on the palace stucco decoration. Giovanni Lazzoni, Nicolas Régnier, Salvator Rosa, and Ludovico Lana also contributed to the palace's art collection.

The palace is also known for its garden vistas reminiscent of Versailles and its fanciful Peschiera or fish-tank. Highlights of the complex also include larger-than-life fountain sculptures based on the designs of Gian Lorenzo Bernini and Renaissance fresco fragments by Nicolò dell’Abbate recovered from the Scandiano palace in Reggio Emilia.

Restoration of the piano nobile in 2001 has allowed the palace to be equally used as a space for contemporary art exhibitions, fusing past and present. Terminating the tour of the Duke and Duchesses’ private and public apartments on the first floor, the Stuccoed apartments have hosted the exhibition “MONOCHROMATIC LIGHT” since 2003. The gilded reliefs previously framing the duke's favourite artworks shall house various minimalist pieces donated by the Panza collection until 2103.

Key works 
·     The Musicians of the Scandiano Room of Paradise frescoes by Nicolò dell’Abbate

·     Baptism of Christ by Luigi Anguissola

·     Portrait of Francesco II d’Este by Andrea Baratta (nicknamed "the monkey")

·     Allegory of Music; Ten Virtues by Jean Boulanger

·     Thank you; Going home; Family; Under the shadow by Lawrence Carroll

·     Religious effigies by Pierfrancesco Cittadini

·     Market scene with fish and meat seller with Christ in Martha’s house attributed to Flemish school.

·     The Dead Christ Mourned, attributed to Abraham Janssens

·     Madonna of Fiorano by Ludovico Lana

·     St John the Baptist by Camillo Procaccini

·     Madonna of the Pearls by follower of Raphael

·     Francesco I with his wife Maria Farnese and their children Alfonso and Isabella by Nicolas Régnier.

Gallery

See also 
 List of Baroque residences
 Gallerie Estensi
 Galleria Estense
 Pinacoteca Nazionale in Ferrara
 Estense University Library
 Estense Lapidary Museum

References

External links

Ducal Palace of Sassuolo Official website

Ducal, Sassuolo
Sassuolo
Houses completed in 1458
Houses completed in 1656
Gardens in Emilia-Romagna
Baroque architecture in Emilia-Romagna
Baroque palaces in Italy
Museums in Emilia-Romagna
Historic house museums in Italy
1656 establishments in Italy
National museums of Italy
Este residences
Duchy of Modena and Reggio